China: Democracy That Works is a white paper issued by China's State Council Information Office on 4 December 2021. The white paper lays out various aspects of the Chinese political system, which it claims constitute a whole-process people's democracy. These include the formal aspects of the people's congresses system, local elections and the Chinese People's Political Consultative Conference, as well as avenues for participation in policy formation and civil society such as Legislative Information Offices, employees congresses and Grid Community Management Teams. This white paper claims that there is no fixed model of democracy and China is a democratic country. It also fiercely criticizes American democracy, alluding to its attendant instability. It also criticizes other countries for claiming the sole right to define democracy, and using that status to impose themselves on other countries. Democracy, it claims, is not limited to "one person, one vote", and there are many routes a country may use to realize democracy which may better suit their context.

Observers argue that China issued this white paper to compete with the US for the right to speak about democracy and to counter the US president Joe Biden hosting of the Summit for Democracy.

References

Ideology of the Chinese Communist Party
White papers
2021 in China
2021 documents